If the Ocean Gets Rough is the second album by American singer-songwriter Willy Mason, which was released in the UK on March 5, 2007.

Track listing
Gotta Keep Walking
The World That I Wanted
We Can Be Strong
Save Myself
I Can't Sleep
Riptide
When the River Moves On
If the Ocean Gets Rough
Simple Town
The End of the Race
When the Leaves Have Fallen

References

2007 albums
Willy Mason albums
Virgin Records albums